XHFX-FM is a radio station on 101.3 FM in Guaymas, Sonora, Mexico, also broadcasting on XEFX-AM 630. It is owned by Radio Sonora, S.A. and is known as Amor 101 FM with a romantic format.

History
XEFX-AM 630 received its concession on March 31, 1955. The 250-watt station was owned by José Ramos Regalado and Guillermo Acosta Ochoa. In 1967, XEFX was sold to Radio Sonora, S.A., and in the 1980s, XEFX increased daytime power to a full kilowatt.

XEFX migrated to FM in 2010 as XHFX-FM 101.3. It remains on air because five people would lose all radio service were it to close, per a 2018 IFT study.

References

Radio stations in Sonora
Radio stations in Mexico with continuity obligations